Captain Robert Francis Hugh Philpot-Brookes  (11 August 1912 – 28 May 1940) was a first-class cricketer and British Army officer. Born in Fulham in 1912, he was educated at King's College School in Wimbledon, joining the cricket team there.

Joining the British Army, Philpot-Brookes was commissioned as an officer in the 1st Battalion, Northamptonshire Regiment and was posted to British India Whilst serving there, he took part in two first-class cricket matches representing Europeans, scoring a century during the former. In 1935, Philpot-Brookes also represented Punjab.

In 1940, Philpot-Brookes, who had transferred to the 2nd Battalion, traveled to France to be part of the British Expeditionary Force (BEF). During the German invasion, Captain Philpot-Brookes was killed during the Battle of Dunkirk in a rearguard action at Mont-Saint-Éloi. He was buried at Bus House Cemetery.

See also
 List of cricketers who were killed during military service

References

External links
 Philpot-Brookes at CWGC

1912 births
1940 deaths
People from Fulham
People educated at King's College School, London
English cricketers
Europeans cricketers
Punjab, India cricketers
Northamptonshire Regiment officers
British Army personnel killed in World War II
Military personnel from London
Burials in Hauts-de-France